Riley Bidois (born 12 March 2002) is a professional New Zealand footballer who plays as a forward for Dandenong City.

Bidois joined the Wellington Phoenix Reserves in 2019 after he was spotted playing in the Western Springs U17 tournament where he was Golden Boot. Before that, Bidois played for Tauranga City in the NRFL Division 1 for two years.

During 2020, Bidois also played for Lower Hutt City who were the Wellington Phoenix feeder club, that allowed the Phoenix team and players to play in the Central League portion of the New Zealand National League. He again played for Lower Hutt City in 2021 and was the leagues second top goalscorer with 16 goals behind fellow Phoenix player George Ott.

Bidois was first called up to the Wellington Phoenix first team in April 2021 after a number of injuries affected the first team. He made his debut, coming of the bench late in the second half of the Phoenix 5–0 loss to Central Coast Mariners.

In February 2023 Bidois signed for Dandenong City in the NPL Victoria 2.

References

External links

Living people
2002 births
New Zealand association footballers
Association football forwards
Wellington Phoenix FC players